Mira Kasslin (born 26 January 1978) is a Finnish cyclist. She competed at the 1996 Summer Olympics and the 2000 Summer Olympics.

References

1978 births
Living people
Finnish female cyclists
Olympic cyclists of Finland
Cyclists at the 1996 Summer Olympics
Cyclists at the 2000 Summer Olympics
Sportspeople from Helsinki